Siagonium is a genus of flat rove beetles in the family Staphylinidae. There are about 12 described species in Siagonium.

Species
These 12 species belong to the genus Siagonium:

 Siagonium americanum (Melsheimer, 1844)
 Siagonium haroldi Weise, 1879
 Siagonium humerale Germar, 1836
 Siagonium incertum
 Siagonium kojimai
 Siagonium miyamotoi Takai & Nakane, 1985
 Siagonium punctatum (LeConte, 1866)
 Siagonium quadricorne Kirby & Spence, 1815
 Siagonium shokhini Khachikov, 2007
 Siagonium stacesmithi (Hatch, 1957)
 Siagonium vittatum Fauvel, 1875
 Siagonium yamashitai

References

Further reading

External links

 

Piestinae
Articles created by Qbugbot